Savoca  is a genus of moths of the family Noctuidae.

Species
 Savoca divitalis Walker, 1863
 Savoca lophota Turner, 1909
 Savoca xista Swinhoe, 1893

References
 Natural History Museum Lepidoptera genus database
 Savoca at funet.fi

Stictopterinae